Pierre Denis, known also as Pêr Denez (3 February 1921 – 30 July 2011), was a French linguist, lexicographer, scholar and writer.

Denis was born in Rennes.  Thanks to his contributions in the form of novels, essays and linguistics, he contributed to the preservation of the written Breton language. He died in Romillé.

Publications

Fiction
 Glas evel daoulagad c'hlas na oant ket ma re, Al Liamm 1979, translated in English by Ian Press: Blue Like Blue Eyes Which Were Not My Own, Mouladurioù Hor Yezh 1993, 
 Hiroc'h eo an amzer eget ar vuhez, Mouladurioù Hor Yezh, 1981
 Evit an eil gwech, MHY, 1982
 Eus un amzer 'zo bet, MHY, 1992
 En tu all d'an douar ha d'an neñv, MHY, 1993
 Kenavo ar c'hentañ er joaioù, MHY, 1994
 An amzer a ra e dro 1995
 Da Rouz An Noz, MHY, 1996

Poems
P'emañ ar mor o regel..., Skrid, 1001

Linguistics and language methodology
 Kentelioù brezhoneg : eil derez, Al Liamm, 1971
 Brezhoneg buan hag aes, Omnivox, 1972 (reprinted by Hor Yezh, 1997; English edition tr. and adapted by R. Delaporte, Cork University Press, 1977, 1980)
 Étude structurale d'un parler breton : Douarnenez, thèse (3 vol.), Université de Rennes, 1977
 Geriadur brezhoneg Douarnenez, 4 vol., Mouladurioù Hor Yezh, 1980, 1981, 1985
 Mont war-raok gant ar brezhoneg, MHY, 1987

Articles and essays
In French
 Joseph Ollivier, Les contes de Luzel (Préface de Per Denez, suivie d'une Postface sur “Contes Bretons” Pur-Terre de Brume, 1994), Hor Yezh, 1995 
 Bretagne et peuples d'Europe, MHY, 1999.

In Breton
 Yezh ha bro, MHY, 1998.

Diverse
 Korf an den Brest, Skridoù Breizh, 1943.

Translations
 Theodor Storm, Aquis submersus, Al Liamm, 1950

Bibliography
 Bernard et Jacqueline Le Nail, Dictionnaire des romanciers de Bretagne, rubrique Per Denez, p. 80. Spézet, Keltia Graphic éditions, 1999,

References 
Per Denez: Writer and scholar who sought recognition for the Breton language and culture, The Independent, Friday, 2 September 2011

1921 births
2011 deaths
Linguists of Breton
Writers from Rennes
Breton-language writers
Breton nationalists
Linguists from France
French male writers
Academic staff of Rennes 2 University